Mount Fyffe is a mountain peak in the Seaward Kaikoura Range, Canterbury region of New Zealand's South Island. The mountain was named after Robert Fyffe, a whaler who introduced sheep and milking goats to Kaikōura.

Location  

The summit lies within cirka 11 km of Kaikōura. On a clear day, it provides views of the Banks Peninsula in the south and North Island in the north.

About 2 kms from the top, there is a backcountry shelter Mt Fyffe Hut. 8-bunk hut is managed by the Department of Conservation.

Access 

A rough 4WD track goes all the way to the top of Mount Fyffe. This track can be used both by hikers and mountain bikers.

Gallery

References

Kaikōura District
Fyffe